Jean Pontier (13 November 1932 – 14 November 2022) was a French politician of the Radical Party of the Left.

Pontier died in Tournon-sur-Rhône on 14 November 2022, at the age of 90.

References

1932 births
2022 deaths
Deputies of the 11th National Assembly of the French Fifth Republic
Radical Party of the Left politicians
People from Nîmes